Blepharomastix dadalis is a moth in the family Crambidae. It was described by Herbert Druce in 1895. It is found in Costa Rica and Panama.

The forewings and hindwings are silky white. The forewings with the costal margin, apex, and outer margin are shaded with dusky brown. There is a small spot in the cell and another at the end of it, as well as a submarginal pale brown waved line. The hindwings are crossed by a waved brown line below the middle and the apex is bordered with dusky brown.

References

Moths described in 1895
Blepharomastix